The Balaitús (Spanish) or Pic du Balaïtous (French) is a granitic massif of the Pyrenees, located right on the border between Spain and France.

Geography
Balaitús marks the starting point of the High Pyrenees. Its height is  AMSL, and it is the nearest mountain to the Atlantic coast to surpass . Its name may come from the Occitan words "vath" (valley) and "leitosa" (milky). Another Spanish name for the mountain is Pico de los Moros (Moors' peak).

It separates the Spanish Tena Valley (Sallent de Gállego) from the French Val d'Azun.

Climbing history

The first ascent was of the peak was made in 1825 by French geodesic technicians Peytier and Hossard. The second ascent was made in 1864 by Charles Packe.

Routes

From France the most frequent route goes through Las Neous glacier starting from any of the refuges nearby: Larribet (2,060 m), Balaïtous (G. Ledormeur) (1,970 m) or Arrémoulit (2,305 m).

From Spain the route starts at La Sarra car park, near Sallent de Gállego, climbing via the Arriel lakes or the Respumoso lake.

See also
List of Pyrenean three-thousanders

References

External links
 

Mountains of Aragon
Mountains of the Pyrenees
Pyrenean three-thousanders